The two lists of the largest cities in Central America given below are based on two different definitions of a city, the urban agglomeration and the city proper. In both lists Central America is defined as consisting of Belize, Guatemala, Honduras, El Salvador, Nicaragua, Costa Rica and Panama. All estimates and projections given have a reference date of mid-2015.

Largest urban agglomerations
Estimates for all agglomerations with 300,000 or more inhabitants are included. Projections are as of 2022.

Largest cities proper
All cities proper with a population of 200,000 or more are included. Estimates are as of 2015.

See also 
 Lists of cities in Central America

Notes

References

Largest
Central America
Largest cities in Central America